Nokuthula Thahane (born 25 September 1995), also known as Natasha Thahane, is a South African actress, model and media personality. She is best known for her roles in the television series Blood & Water, Skeem Saam, The Queen, and It's OK We're Family. Recently joined the BET drama Isono playing a role of Millicent

Early life
Thahane was born in Orlando East to Trevor Thamsanqa Tutu and Nomaswazi Mamakoko. She is the granddaughter of Archbishop Desmond Tutu. She moved to Cape Town where she attended Milnerton High School. She went on to graduate with a degree in accounting from the University of the Witwatersrand. In 2018, she completed a 1-Year Conservatory program in Acting for Film at the New York Film Academy in Manhattan.

Career
Thahane first appeared on screen in a 2013 Edgars commercial. The following year, she made her television series debut in an installment of the e.tv anthology eKasi: Our Stories titled "Drama King". She returned the following year for another installment, "uManqoba". She made a guest appearance as Fundiswa in season 1 of Saints and Sinners and reprised the role as a recurring character in season 2.

From 2015 to 2016, Thahane gained prominence through her role as Enhle Tango in the SABC1 soap opera Skeem Saam. She left to join the cast of the Mzansi Magic televnovela The Queen as Amogelang Maake. She was series regular for the first two seasons and then a recurring for the next two. She starred as Leshae K in the SABC3 series It's OK We're Family. In 2019, she played the role Katlego Jali in seasons 4 and 5 Lockdown.

In 2020, she began playing Wendy Dlamini in the Netflix teen crime drama Blood & Water. That same year, she appeared in the BET Africa series Isono and was appointed as the brand ambassador of "Garnier Even & Matte". Meanwhile, she also appeared in the reality show Top Billing.

Filmography

Film

Television

References

External links
 
 Natasha Thahane at TVSA

Living people
1995 births
Actresses from Cape Town
21st-century South African actresses
New York Film Academy alumni
People from Soweto
South African female models
South African television actresses
University of the Witwatersrand alumni